Zhanggong District is the administrative center of the prefecture-level city of Ganzhou in the south of Jiangxi Province, China. The oldest part of Ganzhou's ancient sewage system named Fushou Gou, which was built during the eleventh century AD and still in use today, is located in Zhanggong District.

As of 2003, the district covers an area of 479 square kilometers, and has a population of 546,000.

Administrative divisions
In the present, Zhanggong District has 5 subdistricts and 7 townships.
5 subdistricts

7 towns

Transportation
Ganzhou railway station is located here.

References

External links
Official website of Zhanggong District: Chinese, English

Ganzhou
County-level divisions of Jiangxi